Thabaton is an Indian Meitei language film series. The series consists of Thabaton 1 (2013),  Thabaton 2 (2014),  Thabaton 3 (2019),  Thabaton 4 and Thabaton 5.
It is produced in the digital feature film format.

Plot 
Thabaton, a girl, eloped with her lover Yaima. Their relationship resulted in the conflict between the two lovers' families, even causing murder of each other's family members. However, Thaba and Yaima never parted each other. To retaliate the loss of sons (Yaima's brothers), Yaima's mother sent Yaima to a distant place for his further studies, and she tortured pregnant Thaba during Yaima's absence. A few moments after the child birth, Thaba was forced to leave the house, telling her a lie that Yaima was dead in an air crash. On the other side, Yaima was told by his parents that Thaba willingly left home as she didn't want to stay with them. Unaware of the conspiracies, Thaba married to another man and had a peaceful life. Later, she discovered the truth that her former husband was still alive. When Thaba met Yaima again to explain everything to him, her second husband saw her, which created a misunderstanding in her second husband's mind. Fighting all the odds, Thaba cleared all the misunderstandings from the two men. In the end, Thaba lived with her second husband and had a child. Yaima brought up his child born by Thaba.

Cast 
 Sushmita Mangshatabam as Thaba
 Gokul Athokpam as Thaba's second husband
 Kaiku Rajkumar as Thaba's first husband, Yaima
 Bala Hijam as Yaima's second wife
 Biju Ningombam as Thaba's daughter

Production 
Thabaton, Thabaton 2, and Thabaton 3 were produced by Surjitkanta Ningthoukhongjam under the banner of BB Films Production and directed by Bijgupta Laishram of Sagolband Tera Sadokpam Leikai. Bijgupta Laishram is also the story writer and the screenplay writer of the movie.

Legal battle 
Thabaton's producer Surjitkanta Ningthoukhongjam, who possessed certificates of the first three film series, issued by the Government of India's Central Board of Film Certification, filed an application under order 39 Rule 1, 2 and 3 of CPC, 1908 read with section 60 of Copyright Act, 1957 to issue the "restraining order" against the Yaipha Thouni Thouram ceremony of Thabaton 4 and Thabaton 5, which was planned be held on 26th March, 2021 by other groups of people, under the banner of the "Mapari Arts Production, Khuman Pokpa" without the former producer's knowledge or consent. He claimed the very action to be the violation of the provisions of Copyright Act, 1957 (Copyright law of India).

See also 
 Nangna Nokpa Yengningi
 Amukta Ani
 Keibu Keioiba (film)

Notes

References

External links 

 

 

 

 

2010s Meitei-language films